Alexandre Moreno (born 3 October 1977) is a retired French professional footballer who played as a midfielder or a forward. During his career, he played professionally with Angers, Lorient and Gueugnon.

References

Alexandre Moreno profile at foot-national.com

1977 births
Living people
Footballers from Paris
French footballers
Association football midfielders
Association football forwards
Angers SCO players
FC Lorient players
AS Moulins players
FC Gueugnon players
Pau FC players
FC Sète 34 players
Ligue 2 players
Trélissac FC players